The Estonian Soviet Encyclopedia (abbreviated ENE) is Estonian general encyclopedia which was published between 1968–1976. The publisher was Valgus.

Editor-in-chief was Gustav Naan.

It consists of eight volumes.

References

Estonian encyclopedias